Spiśské Vlachy (Wlachy or Wallendorf, Latin: Villa Latina) is a town in eastern Slovakia. It is in the Spiš region (Szepes in Hungarian or Zips in German). It is now administratively in the district of Spišská Nová Ves, which is part of the Košice Region. The adjective "Spišské" is used to distinguish it from 6 other towns listed as "Olasz" or "Olaszi" in an 1828 Hungarian property tax list. Two “Town wards” (suburbs) belong to Spišské Vlachy:
 Dobra Voľa lies to the north and
 Zahura lies to the south.

Geography
It is situated just north of the Hornád River, near its confluence with the Margencanka stream. It is 389 meters above sea level and is located at 48 degrees 57 minutes North and 20 degrees 48 minutes East. It has a temperate climate. Its average temperature is about 6 degrees. The annual rainfall is 650 millimeters. The soil is  favorable for meadows with more fertile land to the south. The southern outskirts have caves and small lakes on the Svätojanský (English: Saint John's) stream.

Notable people
 František Tondra, Roman Catholic bishop

References
Notes

External links
Municipal website

Cities and towns in Slovakia